Nickel forms a series of mixed oxide compounds which are commonly called nickelates.
A nickelate is an anion containing nickel or a salt containing a nickelate anion, or a double compound containing nickel bound to oxygen and other elements.  Nickel can be in different or even mixed oxidation states, ranging from +1, +2, +3 to +4. The anions can contain a single nickel ion, or multiple to form a cluster ion. The solid mixed oxide compounds are often ceramics, but can also be metallic.  They have a variety of electrical and magnetic properties. Rare-earth elements form a range of perovskite nickelates, in which the properties vary systematically as the rare-earth element changes.  Fine tuning of properties is achievable with mixtures of elements, applying stress or pressure, or varying the physical form.

Inorganic chemists call many compounds that contain nickel centred anions "nickelates".  These include the chloronickelates, fluoronickelates, tetrabromonickelates, tetraiodonickelates, cyanonickelates, nitronickelates and other nickel-organic acid complexes such as oxalatonickelates.

Alkali nickelates
The lithium nickelates are of interest to researchers as cathodes in lithium cells, as these substance can hold a variable amount of lithium, with the nickel varying in oxidation state.

Rare-earth nickelates
Rare-earth nickelates with nickel in a +1 oxidation state have an electronic configuration to same as for cuprates and so are of interest to high-temperature superconductor researchers. Other rare-earth nickelates can function as fuel cell catalysts. The ability to switch between an insulating and a conducting state in some of these materials is of interest in the development of new transistors, that have higher on to off current ratios.

The rare-earth nickelates were first made by Demazeau et al. in 1971, by heating a mixture of oxides under high pressure oxygen, or potassium perchlorate. However they were unable to make the cerium, praseodymium, and terbium nickelates. This may be because Ce, Pr and Tb oxidises to 4+ions in those conditions. For two decades after that no one paid attention to them. Many rare-earth nickelates have the Ruddlesden–Popper phase structure.

List of oxides

See also
 Nickel manganese oxides for what are considered nickel manganates

References

Nickel compounds
Transition metal oxyanions
Oxometallates